The , also called  or  with reference to the bugaku traditional dance, is the building within a Shinto shrine where the sacred dance (kagura) and music are offered to the kami during ceremonies.
It was originally just a temporary stage; first mentioned in a 9th-century text describing a maidono built in front of Hirano Shrine. In about a century, it had become a permanent shrine feature, and its use was extended until its function as a worship hall prevailed over the original. It is used also for weddings and Noh plays. Some scholars believe the heiden, or hall of worship, has its origins in the kagura-den.

References

Kagura